The Sarral are a tribe of Rajputs found mainly in northern districts of Punjab, Pakistan.

See also
Saral, Chakwal

Punjabi tribes